Sisyranthus is a group of plants in the family Apocynaceae first described as a genus in 1838. It is native to southern Africa.

Species

References

Apocynaceae genera
Asclepiadoideae
Flora of Southern Africa